Miloš Kolejka (18 October 1926 – 30 October 2020) was a Czech gymnast. He competed in eight events at the 1952 Summer Olympics.

References

External links
 

1926 births
2020 deaths
Czech male artistic gymnasts
Olympic gymnasts of Czechoslovakia
Gymnasts at the 1952 Summer Olympics
Place of birth missing